Pseudophilautus nanus, known as southern shrub frog is an extinct species of frog in the family Rhacophoridae. It was endemic to Sri Lanka. This species is known to science only from the lectotype. There have been no records since the species was described in 1869, from material collected in southern Sri Lanka, so it is now believed to be extinct. Recent, extensive field surveys of the amphibian fauna of Sri Lanka have failed to rediscover this frog along with many other members of this genus.

References

 Kelum Manamendra-Arachchi, Anslem de Silva 2004. Pseudophilautus nanus. In: IUCN 2011. IUCN Red List of Threatened Species. Version 2011.2. <www.iucnredlist.org>. Downloaded on 16 April 2012.

nanus
Frogs of Sri Lanka
Endemic fauna of Sri Lanka
Extinct amphibians
Amphibian extinctions since 1500
Amphibians described in 1869
Taxa named by Albert Günther
Taxonomy articles created by Polbot